Hannah Darling may refer to:
 Hannah Darling (rugby union)
 Hannah Darling (golfer)